Roland Hattenberger (born 7 December 1948) is a former Austrian footballer.

Club career
Born in Jenbach, Tyrol, Hattenberger started his professional career at lower league outfit Wattens, before moving to Austrian Football Bundesliga side SSW Innsbruck in 1971. After three seasons there he was lured to the German Bundesliga and stayed there for seven years with SC Fortuna Köln and VfB Stuttgart. He rejoined Innsbruck in 1981 and finished his career with SC Kufstein in 1987.

International career
He made his debut for Austria in  a June 1972 World Cup qualification match against Sweden and was a participant at the 1978 and 1982 World Cups. He earned 51 caps, scoring three goals. His last international game was on 28 June 1982 at the World Cup against France.

His son, Matthias Hattenberger plays currently in the Austrian Erste Liga for First Vienna FC 1894.

Honours
SSW Innsbruck
 Austrian Football Bundesliga: 1971–72, 1972–73
 Austrian Cup: 1972–73

References

External links
 Roland Hattenberger at Fussballportal 
 
 

1948 births
Living people
People from Schwaz District
Austrian footballers
Austrian expatriate footballers
Austria international footballers
1978 FIFA World Cup players
1982 FIFA World Cup players
FC Wacker Innsbruck players
SC Fortuna Köln players
VfB Stuttgart players
Austrian Football Bundesliga players
Bundesliga players
2. Bundesliga players
Expatriate footballers in West Germany
Association football midfielders
Footballers from Tyrol (state)
Austrian expatriate sportspeople in West Germany
WSG Tirol players